Sakhsabad (also Romanized as Sakhsābād) is a village in Zeynabad Rural District, Shal District, Buin Zahra County, Qazvin Province, Iran. At the 2016 census, its population was 1,087 in 292 families.

References 

Populated places in Buin Zahra County